Davis Agesa Amuyunzu is Kenyan striker currently in the ranks of Kenyan Premier League side Nairobi City Stars.

Club career
Agesa is reported to have had a brief stint with Seychelle's side Revengers FC in 2015, a club he joined from lower-tier side Vapor Sports.

In 2017 Agesa joined Nairobi City Stars and went on to score seven goals by the end of the season. He moved to the Kenyan Premier League side Thika United F.C. in the first part of the 2018 season before returning to City Stars after featuring in ten games.

He was to head out for a short stint in Asia before returning to City stars for the second part of the 2018/19 season.

He was part of City Stars' second-tier title-winning 2019/20 season where he became the club's top scorer in the second tier. He then committed to stay on at the club for two further seasons upon the team's return to the top tier.

He registered two assists on his debut for City Stars in the 2020-21 FKF Premier League season-opener in Narok in late November 2020.

Honours

Club
Nairobi City Stars
National Super League'
 Champions (1): 2019-20

References

External links
 

1995 births
Living people
Kenyan footballers
Kenyan Premier League players
Thika United F.C. players
Nairobi City Stars players